KSKZ (98.1 FM) is a radio station broadcasting a Top 40/CHR format. Licensed to Copeland, Kansas, United States, the station serves the Dodge City and Garden City areas. The station is currently owned by Mark Yearout, through licensee Southwind Broadcasting, LLC, and features programming from ABC Radio.

References

External links

SKZ
Hot adult contemporary radio stations in the United States
Radio stations established in 1977